Kathleen Dibolelo Mahlatsi (born 12 June 1984) is a South African politician who has been a Member of the Free State Executive Council for Public Works and Infrastructure and a Member of the Free State Provincial Legislature since March 2023. She is a former Member of the National Assembly of South Africa from the Free State. Mahlatsi is a member of the African National Congress.

Early life and background
Mahlatsi was born on 12 June 1984 in Bloemfontein. She attended Brebner High School before going on to study at the Central University of Technology and the University of the Free State. Before she was elected to parliament in 2019, Mahlatsi worked for the Free State Department of Public Works, Roads and Transport and the Free State Department of Social Development.

Political career
In December 2018, she was elected as the second deputy national secretary of the Young Communist League of South Africa. She was elected as deputy provincial secretary of the ANC in the Free State at the party's conference in January 2023.

Parliament
In 2019, Mahlatsi stood for election to the South African National Assembly as 5th on the ANC's list of National Assembly candidates from the Free State. The ANC dominated in the Free State, winning 8 out of the 11 list seats. Mahlatsi was elected in the election and was sworn into office at the first sitting of the new National Assembly on 22 May 2019.

On 27 June 2019, she was named to the Portfolio Committee on Agriculture, Land Reform and Rural Development. On 21 August 2019, she became a non-voting member of the  Ad Hoc Committee to Amend Section 25 of the Constitution. Mahlatsi became a voting member on 10 February 2020.

Mahlatsi supports land expropriation without compensation. During the debate on the 2020 State of the Nation Address on 18 February 2020, Mahlatsi said: "As the ANC, we are looking at land, not property ... Hon. Speaker, the poor must be given means of production in order to defeat poverty. Land must be used as economic asset." In June 2020, she voted to re-establish the Ad Hoc Committee to Amend Section 25 of the Constitution after its term had expired. She said that the "land was stolen and must be returned" and that the ANC had considered the legal, economic and political implications of expropriation without compensation.

In April 2021, Mahlatsi criticised the United Democratic Movement leader, Bantu Holomisa's call for the dissolution of the national government and the appointment of an interim one until the next general elections in 2024, calling it misinformed, misguided and opportunistic.

Mahlatsi resigned from parliament on 1 March 2023.

Free State government 
Mahlatsi was sworn in as a Member of the Free State Provincial Legislature on 13 March 2023. The following day, Mahlatsi was appointed as Member of the Executive Council (MEC) for Public Works and Infrastructure by premier Mxolisi Dukwana.

References

External links
Ms Kathleen Dibolelo Mahlatsi at Parliament of South Africa

Living people
1984 births
Sotho people
People from Bloemfontein
Members of the National Assembly of South Africa
Women members of the National Assembly of South Africa
African National Congress politicians
University of the Free State alumni